Weaverland Bridge carries Quarry Road (Township Route 894) across the Conestoga River near Terre Hill, East Earl Township, Lancaster County, Pennsylvania, in the United States. The bridge is notable for its form, a concrete bowstring arch truss. Designer Frank H. Shaw was a consulting engineer to Lancaster County when the bridge was constructed in 1916. Weaverland Bridge was determined to be eligible for the National Register of Historic Places in 1993.

See also
 List of bridges documented by the Historic American Engineering Record in Pennsylvania
 List of crossings of the Conestoga River

References

External links

Bridges completed in 1916
Bridges over the Conestoga River
Bridges in Lancaster County, Pennsylvania
Road bridges in Pennsylvania
Historic American Engineering Record in Pennsylvania
Concrete bridges in the United States
Bowstring truss bridges in the United States